Berjaya Times Square is a 48-storey,  twin tower, hotel, condominium, indoor amusement park and shopping centre complex in Bukit Bintang, Kuala Lumpur, Malaysia. It was opened in October 2003 by the 4th Prime Minister of Malaysia, Tun Dr Mahathir bin Mohamad.

Background 
This building consists of a 19-storey shopping mall, business offices and leisure centre with over 1,000 retail shops, 1,200 luxury service suites, 65 food outlets and entertainment attractions such as the Berjaya Times Square Theme Park.

In April 2005, Borders Group opened its first franchise store here, which was the largest Borders store in the world at the time. However, due to the 2010 economic downturn, it has since been downsized into a smaller operation called Borders Express. In 2016, the Borders Express store was closed.

The Kuala Lumpur Monorail's Imbi station is linked to the building by a footbridge.

History 
Initially, the land belonged to the millionaire and philanthropist Cheong Yoke Choy before World War II. His bungalow stood there until the entire parcel of land was purchased by the Berjaya Group of Tan Sri Vincent Tan for the development of the current Berjaya Times Square.

See also 
 List of the world's largest shopping malls
 List of tallest buildings in Kuala Lumpur

References 

 Silver Kris Magazine, August 2009- National Day Edition

External links 

 Official Berjaya Times Square website
 Owner and Investor Forum
 Berjaya Times Square Hotel Kuala Lumpur Website